The athletics competition at the 1959 Southeast Asian Peninsular Games was held in Bangkok, Thailand.

Men

Women

References
http://www.gbrathletics.com/ic/seag.htm

1959
Southeast Asian Peninsular Games
Athletics
International athletics competitions hosted by Thailand